Elfreth's Alley is an historic street in Philadelphia, dating back to 1703. There are thirty-two houses on the street which were built between 1703 and 1836. The Elfreth's Alley Museum is located at #124 and 126. 

The alley is a National Historic Landmark, which is located in the Old City neighborhood, between North 2nd Street and North Front Street, in the block between Arch and Quarry Streets.

History

Elfreth's Alley is named after Jeremiah Elfreth, an 18th-century blacksmith and property owner. Among the alley's residents were tradesmen and their families, including shipwrights, silver and pewter smiths, glassblowers, and furniture builders. During the 1770s, one-third of the households were headed by women. The Georgian and Federal-style houses and cobblestone pavement of the alley were common in Philadelphia during this time. The houses are typically small, and many are uniquely Philadelphian Trinity houses.

In the late 19th and early 20th centuries, industry began to change the street. Perhaps the first change was a stove factory that took its place in a row of residential houses in 1868. Eventually, factories surrounded Elfreth's Alley. The city's waterfront was only a few blocks away. Industry changed more than the architecture; successive waves of immigrants, lured by the nearby jobs, moved onto the street. In 1900, the neighborhood was overwhelmingly Irish.

In 1934, the Elfreth's Alley Association (EAA) was founded to preserve the alley's historic structures while interpreting the street's history. The EAA helped save the street from demolition, and also lobbied the city to restore the alley's name to "Elfreth's Alley"; it had been designated as the 100 block of Cherry Street years before as part of a street-name simplification program.

Elfreth's Alley is today the product of cycles of urban renewal and decay, and historic preservation efforts. The alley is a tourist attraction and a rare surviving example of 18th-century working-class housing stock. The site stands in sharp contrast to the more frequently preserved grand mansion houses of Philadelphia's Society Hill neighborhood.

Relative to the alley's importance to the history of colonial architecture in America, it is very difficult to find precise information about dating; however there is now a website funded by the National Endowment for the Humanities which provides exact dating for the buildings with new color illustrations of each house, both the colonial-era structures  and the independence-era structures.

Elfreth's Alley Museum
Elfreth's Alley Museum, located in 124–126 Elfreth's Alley, preserves the 18th-century home of a pair of dressmakers. Restored to its appearance in the Colonial era, exhibits in the house and tour guides interpret the life of the house and alley's residents in that era. Guides also discuss other houses on the alley and their inhabitants.

Holiday celebrations

The Elfreth's Alley Association holds several holiday celebrations each year, whose proceeds support the upkeep and restoration of older homes.

For more than seventy years, Elfreth's Alley has celebrated "Fête Day" in early June, which celebrates the Alley's diverse ethnic heritage. Residents open their private homes to the public, and are accompanied by historical reenactments and festivities. The Brandywine Heights High School Band and their Fife and Drum Corps perform 18th-century fife tunes as they parade through the alley.

Sometime around the year 2000, Elfreth's Alley started holding "Deck the Alley" early every December, a self-guided tour of thirteen private homes festooned with Christmas and holiday decorations, and also includes caroling. The Alley also hosts events for Fourth of July, Oktoberfest, and Halloween.

See also
List of National Historic Landmarks in Philadelphia
National Register of Historic Places listings in Center City, Philadelphia

References

External links

Elfreth's Alley Association

1702 establishments in Pennsylvania
Historic American Buildings Survey in Philadelphia
Historic districts in Philadelphia
Historic districts on the National Register of Historic Places in Pennsylvania
National Historic Landmarks in Pennsylvania
National Register of Historic Places in Philadelphia
Neighborhoods in Philadelphia
Old City, Philadelphia
Streets in Philadelphia
Roads on the National Register of Historic Places in Pennsylvania